Allison Sweeney may refer to:

 W. Allison Sweeney (1851–1921), American newspaper writer, editor, and owner
 Alison Sweeney (born 1976), American actress